Johnny Weeks is a fictional character on the HBO drama series The Wire, portrayed by Leo Fitzpatrick. A heroin addict, he commits a series of petty crimes to afford his habit, along with fellow addict Bubbles.

Biography

Season 1
In season 1, Johnny is Bubbles' best friend and a drug addict with notoriously bad luck. He is naive and enthusiastic for "the game", and allows Bubbles to play the role of teacher. In the pilot episode Johnny is badly beaten by Bodie Broadus, Poot Carr, and other dealers after trying to pass counterfeit money to D'Angelo Barksdale's operation. This spurs Bubbles to become a police informant.

While in the hospital for that beating, Johnny discovers he is HIV positive; he also undergoes a colostomy operation.

Season 2
Johnny is first seen by Detective Jimmy McNulty, stealing from a shopping centre with Bubbles. McNulty catches Johnny and Bubbles, but instead of arresting them asks them to find stick up artist Omar Little. At the end of Season 2, Officer Santangelo arrests Bubbles and Johnny stealing morphine from an ambulance. They are released because Bubbles gives information about Proposition Joe's dealers at the projects, when Cheese is shot in the shoulder by Brother Mouzone.

Season 3
Johnny and Bubbles continue to steal from scrapyards. Bubbles would rather make money by continuing to inform detectives McNulty and Greggs. Johnny finds out that Bubbles is a police informant and the two men quarrel and split up. Without Bubbles looking after him, Johnny overdoses and his body is discovered in a vacant house in Major Colvin's "Hamsterdam" free zone.

Origins
Johnny is based on a young white homeless addict David Simon met while researching The Corner.

References

The Wire characters
Television characters introduced in 2002
Fictional characters based on real people
Fictional career criminals
Fictional heroin users
Fictional characters with HIV/AIDS
Fictional homeless people
Male characters in television
Fictional drug-related deaths